Robert Dieudonné (23 June 1879 – 30 September 1940) was a French playwright and journalist of the first half of the 20th century.

Works 
He authored letters, lyrics, libretti and caricatures

 July 1904: he created the characters of countess Riguidi and her daughter Emma in the newspaper L'Œuvre by Gustave Téry, a column that he continued in Le Canard enchaîné. 
 1918: Le cochon qui sommeille ou le coq d'Inde, operetta by Rip, (revision) by Robert Dieudonné, music by Claude Terrasse, directed by Georgé, Concert Mayol.
 January 1920: Gigoletto, operetta in 2 acts, libretto by Rip and Robert Dieudonné, music by Albert Chantrier, La Cigale.
 May 1923:  operetta in 3 acts after Georges Courteline adapted by Robert Dieudonné and Carpentier, Théâtre des Nouveautés.
 September 1924: La Guitare et le jazz-band by Henri Duvernois and Robert Dieudonné, Théâtre des Nouveautés, 22 September.
 January 1931: Brummell operetta in 3 acts, libretto by Rip and Robert Dieudonné, music by Reynaldo Hahn, Folies-Wagram.
 he took part to more than 70 plays
 1940: Until 1940, he was responsible for the fashion column in Le Canard enchaîné.

Honours 
 Officer of the Legion of Honour

External links 
 Robert Dieudonné
 Robert Dieudonné on the base Léonore

References 

20th-century French journalists
20th-century French dramatists and playwrights
Officiers of the Légion d'honneur
Writers from Paris
1879 births
1940 deaths